Denis Chevrier (born 8 June 1954) is a retired Formula One engineer who was the head of engine operations for the Renault F1 team from 2002 to 2007.

Career 
Chevrier graduated with a degree in mechanical design and production. After joining the national engineering school in Metz, the Frenchman began his career as a motorcycle technician in classes up to 125 cm³ and 250 cm³.

As a motorsport enthusiast, however, he always remained open to other disciplines. At Renault-Sport he worked from 1984 as a racing engineer for the Tyrrell Formula 1 team. Chevrier experimented with the possible uses of racing engines. After a year-long excursion into Renault's World Rally Championship project, he concentrated again on Formula 1. In his ten years at Williams F1, he won four world titles with four different drivers: Nigel Mansell in 1992, Alain Prost in 1993, Damon Hill in 1996 and Jacques Villeneuve in 1997.

As operations manager of the engines for Mecachrome / Supertec, he kept his area of ​​responsibility after Renault's comeback as a works team in Formula 1 in 2002. At the end of 2007 Chevrier left the French outfit and was replaced by Rémi Taffin.

References

External links
 Profile at grandprix.com

1954 births
Living people
Formula One engineers
Renault in Formula One